Toby Goodman (November 2, 1948 – July 18, 2021) was an American politician who served in the Texas House of Representatives from the 93rd district from 1991 to 2007.

He died of a heart attack on July 18, 2021, in Mansfield, Texas, at age 72.

References

1948 births
2021 deaths
Republican Party members of the Texas House of Representatives
People from Wichita Falls, Texas